An autoharp or chord zither is a string instrument belonging to the zither family. It uses a series of bars individually configured to mute all strings other than those needed for the intended chord. The term autoharp was once a trademark of the Oscar Schmidt company, but has become a generic designation for all such instruments, regardless of manufacturer.

History

Charles F. Zimmermann, a German immigrant in Philadelphia, was awarded a patent in 1882 for a “Harp” fitted with a mechanism that muted strings selectively during play. He called a zither-sized instrument using this mechanism an “autoharp.” Unlike later designs, the instrument shown in the patent was symmetrical, and the damping mechanism engaged with the strings laterally instead of from above. It is not known if Zimmermann ever produced such instruments commercially. Karl August Gütter of Markneukirchen, Germany, built a model that he called a Volkszither, which was more clearly the prototype of the autoharp in its current form. He obtained a British patent for it c. 1883–1884. In 1885, after returning from a visit to Germany, Zimmermann began production of instruments with the Gütter design. He labeled them autoharps and included his own name and patent number. As a result, Zimmermann is widely but incorrectly regarded as the inventor of the instrument in its now familiar form.

Trademark
A form of the term autoharp in stylized lettering was registered as a trademark in 1926. The word is currently claimed as a trademark by the U.S. Music Corporation, whose Oscar Schmidt Inc. division manufactures autoharps. The USPTO registration, however, covers only a “Mark Drawing Code (5) Words, Letters, and/or Numbers in Stylized Form” and has expired. In litigation with George Orthey, it was held that Oscar Schmidt could only claim ownership of the stylized graphic representation of autoharp, the word itself having come into generic use.

Construction

The autoharp body is made of wood, and has a generally rectangular shape, with one corner cut off.  The soundboard generally features a guitar-like sound-hole, and the top may be either solid wood or of laminated construction.  A pin-block of multiple laminated layers of wood occupies the top and slanted edges, and serves as a bed for the tuning pins, which resemble those used in pianos and concert zithers.

On the edge opposite the top pin-block is either a series of metal pins, or a grooved metal plate, which accepts the lower ends of the strings.  Directly above the strings, on the lower half of the top, are the chord bars, which are made of plastic, wood, or metal, and support felt or foam pads on the side facing the strings.  These bars are mounted on springs, and pressed down with one hand, via buttons mounted to their topside.  The buttons are labeled with the name of the chord produced when that bar is pressed against the strings, and the strings strummed.  The back of the instrument usually has three wooden, plastic, or rubber "feet", which support the instrument when it is placed backside down on a table top, for playing in the traditional position.

Strings run parallel to the top, between the mounting plate and the tuning pins, and pass under the chord bar assembly.  Modern autoharps most often have 36 strings, with some examples having as many as 47 strings, and rare 48-string models (such as Orthey Autoharps No. 136, tuned to G and D major). They are strung in a semi-chromatic manner which, however, is sometimes modified into either diatonic or fully chromatic scales.  Standard models have 12, 15 or 21 chord bars available, providing a selection of major, minor, and dominant seventh chords. These are arranged for historical or systemic reasons. Various special models have also been produced, such as diatonic one-, two-, or three-key models, models with fewer or additional chords, and a reverse-strung model (the 43-string, 28-chord Chromaharp Caroler).

Range and tuning
The range is determined by the number of strings and their tuning.  A typical 36-string chromatic autoharp in standard tuning has a -octave range, from F2 to C6. The instrument is not fully chromatic throughout this range, however, as this would require 44 strings.  The exact 36-string tuning is:

{| class="wikitable"
|-
! Octave
! colspan="12"|Tuning
|-
| Bass octave
| F2 || || G2 || || || || || C3 || || D3 || || E3
|-
| Tenor octave
| F3 || F3 || G3 || || A3 || A3 || B3 || C4 || C4 || D4 || D4 || E4
|-
| Alto octave
| F4 || F4 || G4 || G4 || A4 || A4 || B4 || C5 || C5 || D5 || D5 || E5
|-
| Soprano octave
| F5 || F5 || G5 || G5 || A5 || A5 || B5 || C6 || || || ||
|} 
 
There are a number of gaps in the lowest octave, which functions primarily to provide bass notes in diatonic contexts; there is also a missing G3 in the tenor octave.  The fully chromatic part of the instrument's range begins with A3 (the A below middle C).

Diatonically-strung single-key instruments from modern luthiers are known for their lush sound. This is achieved by doubling the strings for individual notes. Since the strings for notes not in the diatonic scale need not appear in the string bed, the resulting extra space is used for the doubled strings, resulting in fewer damped strings. Two- and three-key diatonics compromise the number of doubled strings to gain the ability to play in two or three keys, and to permit tunes containing accidentals, which could not otherwise be rendered on a single-key harp. A three-key harp in the circle of fifths, such as a GDA, is often called a festival or campfire harp, as the instrument can easily accompany fiddles around a campfire or at a festival.

Chord bars
The standard, factory chord bar layout for a 12-chord autoharp, in two rows, is:

{| border="0" cellpadding="0" cellspacing="0" bgcolor="tan"
|-
| Gm || || || A7 || || || Dm  || || ||  E7 || || || Am || || || D7
|-
| || || B || || || C7 || || ||  F || || || G7 || || || C || || || G
|}

The standard, factory chord bar layout for a 15-chord instrument, in two rows, is:

{| border="0" cellpadding="0" cellspacing="0" bgcolor="tan"
|-
| || D || || || Gm || || || A7 || || || Dm  || || ||  E7 || || || Am || || || D7
|-
|E|| || F7 || || || B || || || C7 || || ||  F || || || G7 || || || C || || || G
|}

The standard, factory chord bar layout for a 21-chord instrument is in three rows:

{| border="0" cellpadding="0" cellspacing="0" bgcolor="tan"
|-
| E || || || B || || || F || || || C || || || G || || || D || || || A
|-
| || F7 || || || C7 || || || G7 || || || D7 || || || A7 || || || E7 || || || B7
|-
| || || A || || || B7 || || || Cm || || || Gm || || || Dm || || || Am || || || Em
|}

A variety of chord bar layouts may be had, both in as-delivered instruments, and after customization.

Electric autoharp 

Until the 1960s, no pickups were available to amplify the autoharp other than rudimentary contact microphones, which frequently had a poor-quality, tinny sound. In the early 1960s, a bar magnetic pickup was designed for the instrument by Harry DeArmond, and manufactured by Rowe Industries. Pinkerton's Assorted Colours used the instrument on their 1966 single "Mirror, Mirror". In the 1970s, Oscar Schmidt came out with their own magnetic pickup. The Evil One, a 1979 hard rock album by Roky Erickson and the Aliens prominently featured the electric autoharp of Bill Miller which granted "an unearthly edge" to the music.

Shown is a 1930 refinished Oscar Schmidt “Model A”. This harp has two DeArmond magnetic pickups (one under the chord bars), with a d'Aigle fine-tuning mechanism, and d'Aigle chord bar assembly, and was used in a 1968 MGM Records/Heritage Records recording by Euphoria.

Variants
A synthesized version of the autoharp, the Omnichord, was introduced in 1981 and is now known as the Q-Chord, described as a "digital songcard guitar".

Playing technique
As initially conceived, the autoharp was played in the position of a concert zither, that is, with the instrument set flat on a table (there are three "feet" on the back for this purpose), and the flat-edge of the instrument (below the chord bars) placed to the player's right.  The left hand worked the chord buttons, and the right hand would strum the strings in the narrow area below the chord bars. Right hand strums were typically done with a plectrum similar to a guitar pick, made of shell, plastic, or compressed felt.  A strum would usually activate multiple strings, playing the chord held down by the left hand.

Partly because of this playing mode, the autoharp came to be thought of as a rhythm instrument for playing chordal accompaniment, and even today many still think of the instrument in that way.  New techniques have been developed, however, and modern players can play melodies on the instrument:  diatonic players, for example, are able to play fiddle tunes using open-chording techniques, "pumping" the damper buttons while picking individual strings. Skilled chromatic players can perform a range of melodies, and even solos including melody, chords, and complex rhythmic accompaniments.

In the mid-20th century performers began experimenting with taking the instrument off the table and playing it in an upright position, held in the lap, with the back of the instrument (having the "feet") held against the chest.  Cecil Null, of the Grand Ole Opry is usually credited as the first to adopt this playing style in public performance, in the 1950s.  In this position the left hand still works the chord buttons, but from the opposite edge of the instrument, and the right hand still executes the strums, but now plays in the area above the chord bars. (See Joe Butler illustration, below.) This playing mode makes a wider area of the strings available to the picking hand, increasing the range of tonal possibilities, and it proved very popular.  It was soon adopted by other performers, notably by members of the Carter Family.

By the early 1970s some players were experimenting with finger-style techniques, where individual fingers of the right hand would pluck specific strings, rather than simply hold a pick and strum chords.  Bryan Bowers became a master of this mode of playing, and developed a complex technique utilizing all five fingers of his right hand.  This allows him to play independent bass notes, chords, melody, and counter melodies as a soloist.  Bowers was also one of the early pioneers in adding a strap to the instrument and playing it while standing up.

Notable performers

Kilby Snow (May 28, 1905 – March 29, 1980) was an American folk musician and virtuoso autoharpist, who won the title of Autoharp Champion of North Carolina at the age of 5.  He developed the "drag note" playing style, a technique that relied on his left-handedness to produce "slurred" notes; he has been enormously influential among autoharpists, and is regarded by many as the first modern autoharp player.

Maybelle Carter of the original Carter Family brought the instrument to prominence in the late 1940s by using it as a lead instrument when performing with her daughters; the Carter Sisters.

Maybelle Carter's granddaughter Carlene Carter frequently plays the autoharp onstage and on her recordings; her song "Me and the Wildwood Rose", a tribute to her grandmother, makes prominent use of the autoharp.

Several Lovin' Spoonful songs feature the autoharp playing of John Sebastian, including "Do You Believe in Magic" and "You Didn't Have to Be So Nice". He also played in the 1979 Randy VanWarmer hit song "Just When I Needed You Most".

Bryan Bowers developed a complex finger-picking style of playing the autoharp (as opposed to the more common strumming technique) which he initially brought to bluegrass performances with The Dillards in the 1970s, and later to several of his own solo albums.

British singer songwriter Corinne Bailey Rae regularly plays the autoharp and composed the title track from her 2010 album The Sea on the autoharp.

Norwegian avant-garde artist Sturle Dagsland frequently performs with an autoharp.

Singer/songwriter Brittain Ashford of the band Prairie Empire is known for using autoharp in her music, including the 2008 release "There, but for You, go I". She also regularly performs on the autoharp as part of her role in Ghost Quartet, a four-person song cycle composed by Dave Malloy.

See also
 Dolceola
 Guitar zither (chord zither, fretless zither)
 Guitaro
 Marxophone
 Omnichord (electronic autoharp)

References

External links
Autoharp Quarterly

Box zithers
American musical instruments